Sebi Tramontana (born December 12, 1960 in Rosolini, Sicili) is a jazz trombonist most often associated with avant-garde jazz and free improvisation music. A member of the Italian Instabile Orchestra, Tramontana has also recorded with such musical artists as Jeb Bishop, Joëlle Léandre, Mario Schiano, and Carlos Zingaro.

Discography

With the Italian Instabile Orchestra

As contributor

References

1960 births
Italian jazz trombonists
Living people
Avant-garde jazz trombonists
Free improvising musicians
Italian jazz musicians
21st-century trombonists
Italian Instabile Orchestra members